Rolfe may refer to:

People
 Rolfe (surname)
 Rolfe (given name)

Places
 Rolfe, Iowa, United States, a city
 Rolfe, West Virginia, United States, an unincorporated community

Entertainment
 Rolfe Photoplays, an American motion picture production company
 Rolfe DeWolfe, the animatronic ventriloquist in The Rock-afire Explosion

See also
 Rolfe's Chop House, a New York City eating establishment
 Rolfe Barn, Concord, New Hampshire, United States, on the National Register of Historic Places
 Rolf, a male given name and surname
 Rolfes, a surname and given name
 Rolfing, a holistic health discipline named after Ida P. Rolf